Maria Strumolo (born 31 May 1949) is an Italian former swimmer. She competed in two events at the 1968 Summer Olympics.

References

1949 births
Living people
Italian female swimmers
Olympic swimmers of Italy
Swimmers at the 1968 Summer Olympics
Swimmers from Milan
Mediterranean Games medalists in swimming
Mediterranean Games gold medalists for Italy
Swimmers at the 1967 Mediterranean Games